Mohammad Reza Heidarian (born 17 February 1974) is an Iranian professional futsal coach and former player.

He was a Winger for Esteghlal, Ceccano, Qatar SC, Elmo Adab, Persepolis and was the captain of Iran national futsal team.

He has been awarded the most valuable player of the Asian Futsal Championship.

Heidarian played for Ceccano Calcio a 5, a Serie A2 futsal side based in the small town of Ceccano. He was highly successful at the club and was selected as captain of the club in the 2004-05 season.

Following Iran's success in the 2008 AFC Futsal Championship, Heidarian decided to bid farewell from international futsal and retired from the national side.

Iran National Futsal Team
Heydarian was suggested to Iran football federation by Mohammad Nazemasharieh, current head coach of Iran national futsal team to join his team, and became coach of National team on 30 of June 2020 by decision of futsal and beach football technical committee of Iran Football Federation.

Honours

Team
 AFC Futsal Championship
 Champions (9): 1999, 2000, 2001, 2002, 2003, 2004, 2005, 2007, 2008

Individual
 Most Valuable Player, AFC Futsal Championship, 2004

Notes and references

External links 
 
 

1974 births
Living people
Sportspeople from Tehran
Iranian men's futsal players
Futsal forwards
Iranian futsal coaches
Esteghlal FSC players
Elmo Adab FSC players
Persepolis FSC players
Shahrvand Sari FSC players
Persepolis FSC managers
Iranian expatriate futsal players
Iranian expatriate sportspeople in Italy
Iranian expatriate sportspeople in Qatar